The FK Cup is a cup competition for futsal clubs in South Korea. First competition was started in 2010.

List of winners

References

 
Futsal in South Korea